Hollowiella is a genus of moths in the family Cossidae.

Species
 Hollowiella amasonca (Yakovlev, 2006)
 Hollowiella bajin Yakovlev & Witt, 2009
 Hollowiella chanwu Yakovlev & Witt, 2009
 Hollowiella rama (Yakovlev, 2006)
 Hollowiella xishuangbannaensis (I. Chou & B. Hua, 1986)

References

  2009: The carpenter moths (Lepidoptera:Cossidae) of Vietnam. Entomofauna, supplement 16: 11-32.

External links
Natural History Museum Lepidoptera generic names catalog

Cossinae
Moth genera